Vivien Ello (born 1974) is a Hungarian table tennis player. Her highest career ITTF ranking was 67.

References

1974 births
Living people
Hungarian female table tennis players
Date of birth missing (living people)